Rethel Mountain is a  mountain summit located in the Garibaldi Ranges of the Coast Mountains, in northwestern Garibaldi Provincial Park of southwestern British Columbia, Canada. Its nearest higher peak is Parkhurst Mountain,  to the southeast. It was named in association from Rethel station (since closed) on the Pacific Great Eastern Railway route. The mountain's name was officially adopted on February 27, 1978, by the Geographical Names Board of Canada.

Climate

Based on the Köppen climate classification, Rethel Mountain is located in the marine west coast climate zone of western North America. Most weather fronts originate in the Pacific Ocean, and travel east toward the Coast Mountains where they are forced upward by the range (Orographic lift), causing them to drop their moisture in the form of rain or snowfall. As a result, the Coast Mountains experience high precipitation, especially during the winter months in the form of snowfall. Winter temperatures can drop below −20 °C with wind chill factors below −30 °C. The months July through September offer the most favorable weather for climbing Rethel Mountain.

See also
 
 Geography of British Columbia
 Geology of British Columbia

References

External links
 Weather: Rethel Mountain

Garibaldi Ranges
Two-thousanders of British Columbia
Sea-to-Sky Corridor
New Westminster Land District